The Nutty Professor is a 1963 American science fiction comedy film directed, co-written (with Bill Richmond) by, and starring Jerry Lewis. The film also co-stars Stella Stevens, Del Moore, Kathleen Freeman, Howard Morris, and Elvia Allman. The score was composed by Walter Scharf. A parody of Robert Louis Stevenson's 1886 novella Strange Case of Dr. Jekyll and Mr. Hyde, it follows bullied scientist Julius Kelp as he creates a serum that transforms him into a handsome man, which he subsequently uses under his alter ego Buddy Love.

The Nutty Professor has been described as perhaps the finest and most memorable film of Lewis's career. In 2004, The Nutty Professor was selected for preservation in the United States National Film Registry by the Library of Congress as being "culturally, historically, or aesthetically significant".

A remake was released in 1996, directed by Tom Shadyac and starring Eddie Murphy and Jada Pinkett-Smith. A sequel, Nutty Professor II: The Klumps, followed in 2000, and an animated sequel to the 1963 film was released in 2008. Lewis directed a musical theatre version in 2012. A new version of the musical, featuring the last score by Marvin Hamlisch, book and lyrics by Rupert Holmes and direction by Marc Bruni, will be staged from July 1 to August 6, 2022 at the Ogunquit Playhouse in Ogunquit, Maine.

Plot
Professor Julius Kelp is a nerdy, scruffy, buck-toothed, accident-prone, socially awkward university professor whose experiments in the classroom laboratory are unsuccessful and highly destructive. When a football-playing bully embarrasses and attacks him, Kelp decides to "beef up" by joining a local gym. Kelp's lack of physical strength leads him to seek a solution in his specialty of chemistry. He invents a serum that turns him into Buddy Love: a handsome, suave, charming and brash girl-chasing hipster.

This new personality gives him the self-confidence to pursue one of his students, Stella Purdy. Although she resents Love, she finds herself strangely attracted to him. Buddy wows the crowd with his jazzy, breezy musical delivery and poised demeanor at the Purple Pit, a nightclub where the students hang out. He also mocks a bartender and waitress and punches a student. The formula wears off at inopportune times, often to Kelp's humiliation.

Although Kelp knows that his alternate persona is a bad person, he cannot prevent himself from continually taking the formula as he enjoys the attention that Love receives. As Buddy performs at the annual student dance the formula starts to wear off. His real identity now revealed, Kelp gives an impassioned speech, admitting his mistakes and seeking forgiveness. Kelp says that the one thing he learned from being someone else is that if you don't like yourself, you can't expect others to like you. Purdy meets Kelp backstage, and confesses that she prefers Kelp over Buddy Love.

Eventually, Kelp's formerly timid father chooses to market the formula (a copy of which Kelp had sent to his parents' home for safekeeping), endorsed by the deadpan president of the university who proclaims, "It's a gasser!" Kelp's father makes a pitch to the chemistry class, and the students all rush forward to buy the new tonic. In the confusion Kelp and Purdy slip out of the class. Armed with a marriage license and two bottles of the formula, they elope.

During the short closing credits, each of the characters comes out and bows down to the camera, and when Jerry Lewis, still portraying Kelp, comes out and bows, he trips and falls over the camera, causing the picture to go white, as if Lewis broke the film being projected at that moment.

Cast

Characters
The basic characterization of Julius Kelp was a Lewis staple, having appeared earlier in Rock-A-Bye Baby (1958), and basically identical characters would appear in The Family Jewels (1965), The Big Mouth (1967), and in various sketches on his self-titled variety show in the late 1960s.

Buddy Love is often interpreted as a lampoon of Lewis' show business partner Dean Martin; the duo were highly successful from 1946 to 1956 before an acrimonious breakup when they did not speak to each other for decades. Lewis, however, consistently denied this rumor. In his 1982 autobiography and again in a DVD featurette entitled The Nutty Professor: Making The Formula, Lewis stated that the character was based on every obnoxious, self-important, hateful hipster he ever knew. In the DVD commentary, Lewis speculates that he perhaps should have made Love more evil rather than simply obnoxious — since to his surprise more fan mail came for Love than for the professor. Film critic Danny Peary made the claim in his 1981 book Cult Movies that the character of Love is actually a representation of a dark side of Lewis's real personality. Lewis stated that the two represented good and evil.

The character of Professor Frink from the animated television series The Simpsons loosely borrows many of his mannerisms and technique from Lewis' delivery of the Julius Kelp character, as well as the transition to a Buddy Love version of Frink in several episodes. In the episode Treehouse of Horror XIV, the character of Frink's father was voiced by Lewis.

Production
The entire production was filmed from October 9 to December 17, 1962, mostly on the campus of Arizona State University in Tempe, Arizona. The cast's costumes were designed by Edith Head.

Walter Scharf's score makes extensive use of the Victor Young jazz standard Stella by Starlight including an upbeat version over the film's main titles. Paramount was the copyright holder of the theme from its original appearance in The Uninvited (1944). Les Brown and his Band of Renown play themselves in the extended senior prom scenes.

Love instructs the bartender to make an Alaskan Polar Bear Heater, "mix it nice" and pour it into a tall glass. The bartender asks if he can take a sip; after doing so, he freezes like a statue. While the drink started as fictional, it is now listed on some cocktail websites.

Product placement of RC Cola is noticeable throughout the film in the form of soda bottles, vending machines and even a delivery truck. Lewis was then under contract as a celebrity endorsement for the soft drink.

Reception
On Rotten Tomatoes, the film holds an 81% rating based on 26 reviews, with an average rating of 6.7/10.

Awards and honors
In 2000, the American Film Institute placed the film on its 100 Years...100 Laughs list, where it was ranked No. 99.

The National Film Preservation Board, USA included it among the 25 films inducted into the Library of Congress in 2004 for the National Film Registry.

Home media
The Nutty Professor was released on DVD in October 2000. In October 2004, a "Special Edition" was released including an audio commentary by Lewis and Steve Lawrence, a documentary and a short feature. In the commentary, Lewis discusses aspects of production, including his creating a real-time, on-camera monitor, which subsequently became standard in the film industry, known as video assist. He mentions that he recut the film for his own home viewing. He also identifies scenes that he would have liked to redo; for example, making the professor's watch sound tinny.

The DVD of the film contains a long deleted scene in which Kelp's love interest is portrayed as a sultry siren whose choreographed, jaw-dropping entrance to the Purple Pit, accompanied by jazz music, contrasts with the final edit in which she is portrayed as smart but fairly unassuming.

The Nutty Professor received a "50th anniversary" Blu-ray release in June 2014 as an "Ultimate Collector's Edition" set. This release included all the bonus features from the previous DVD release, a new documentary short, Jerry Lewis: No Apologies, and three additional Jerry Lewis films on DVD. A disc-only release followed in September 2014.

Sequel
Lewis had for decades talked about doing a sequel and eventually settled for the 1996 remake starring Eddie Murphy, for which Lewis was credited as a producer. The 1996 version did produce a sequel of its own, Nutty Professor II: The Klumps.

An animated direct-to-DVD sequel, also titled The Nutty Professor, featured the voices of Lewis and Drake Bell and was released on November 25, 2008. Directed by Paul Taylor, the film involves Julius Kelp's teenage grandson Harold discovering his grandfather's secret formula and unleashing his own alter ego.

Musical adaptation
A musical comedy adaptation ran on Broadway after a tryout production that opened at the Nashville Tennessee Performing Arts Center from July to August 2012. Lewis directed the musical, with choreography by Joann M. Hunter. The musical has a book and lyrics written by Rupert Holmes and music composed by Marvin Hamlisch, with scenery by David Gallo and costumes by Ann Hould-Ward. Michael Andrew was cast in the lead role as Professor Julius Kelp. The plot closely follows the original film. The production received warm reviews for its choreography, songs, cast, set, and story.

See also

 List of American films of 1963
 The Nutty Professor (film series)

References

External links

 
 
 
 
 
 

Dr. Jekyll and Mr. Hyde films
The Nutty Professor
1963 films
1963 romantic comedy films
1960s American films
1960s English-language films
1960s science fiction comedy films
American romantic comedy films
American science fiction comedy films
American science fiction romance films
Films about educators
Films directed by Jerry Lewis
Films scored by Walter Scharf
Films set in universities and colleges
Films shot in Arizona
Films with screenplays by Bill Richmond (writer)
Films with screenplays by Jerry Lewis
Mad scientist films
Paramount Pictures films
United States National Film Registry films